Dahan Rud may refer to:
 Dahan Rud, Khusf
 Dahan Rud, Nehbandan